Saint Cormac may refer to:

 Cormac of Armagh  (c. 430– 497), Bishop of Armagh and Abbot of Armagh monastery, Ireland from 481 to 497
 Cormac mac Cuilennáin (died 908), Irish bishop and the king of Munster from 902 until his death at the Battle of Bellaghmoon